Guadagno may refer to:

Anton Guadagno (1925-2002), an Italian operatic conductor;
Donald Walter Guadagno (born 1926) was the birth name of American Don Gordon (actor)
Kim Guadagno, Lieutenant Governor of New Jersey since 2010